Eric Evans may refer to:

Sportspeople
Eric Evans (rugby union, born 1894) (1894–1955), Wales rugby union footballer and administrator
Eric Evans (rugby union, born 1921) (1921–1991), English rugby union footballer
Eric Evans (canoeist) (born 1950), American competitive canoer

Others
Eric Evans (priest, born 1928) (1928–1996), Anglican priest and Dean of St Paul's (London)
Eric J. Evans (fl. 1966–2011), British academic and historian
Eric Evans (priest, born 1902) (1902–1977), Archdeacon of Warrington
Eric Evans (technologist), a technologist who coined the term domain-driven design in 2003